Abhishek Rawat is an Indian actor. He is best known for portraying the role of Manav Vajpayee in Kaamnaa.

Career
Rawat's first show was Neelanjana, in which he played a cameo role. His landed his second role in Babul Ka Aangann Chootey Na and portrayed Mahem. Then he received his first major role as Shekhar Singh in Agle Janam Mohe Bitiya Hi Kijo. In Mann Kee Awaaz Pratigya, Rawat portrayed Tanmay. He has also appeared in a short film titled Kissss.

Filmography

Television

Films

References

External links
 Interview with Abhishek

1987 births
Living people
Male actors from Uttarakhand
Indian male soap opera actors
Male actors in Hindi television
21st-century Indian male actors